The Serge Lazareff Prize is an international decoration given to civilians and military personnel within the framework of the Office of Legal Affairs of the Supreme Headquarters Allied Powers Europe of the North Atlantic Treaty Organization.

Background 
The Serge Lazareff Prize was created in 2017 to recognize all those people who, both engaged with NATO and from outside the organisation, for their outstanding contribution to NATO ACO Office of Legal Affairs, as well as all those who have contributed to supporting or develop knowledge of their legal position. The prize is named in honor of the prestigious jurist, academician and NATO lawyer, Serge Lazareff, who played a significant role in developing the NATO Status of Forces Agreement.

Types and categories
There are five different Serge Lazareff Prize types:
 Grand Star.
 Commander.
 Star.
 Certificate of Recognition.
 Long service, belongs to the extraordinary category, for long-term legal staff who have served in any of the Legal Offices of the Allied Command of Operations.

There are two different categories:
 Ordinary, where we can distinguish four subcategories.
 Individual.
 With distinction, individual.
 Collective.
 Honorific.
 Extraordinary.

The Serge Lazareff Prize is usually presented by the Director of the NATO ACO Office of Legal Affairs, a position currently held by the spanish Mr.  Andrés B. Muñoz Mosquera.

Insignia and ribbons

See also
North Atlantic Treaty Organization
Supreme Headquarters Allied Powers Europe
Allied Command Operations
International decoration
Orders, decorations, and medals of Spain
NATO Medal

References 

Medals of NATO
NATO